Canouan (pronounced "can - ah - wan") is an island in the Grenadines belonging to Saint Vincent and the Grenadines. It is a small island, measuring only  and has a surface of 7.6 km2. The population is about 1,700.

A barrier reef runs along the Atlantic side of the island. The highest point on the island is Mount Royal. Two bays, Glossy and Friendship, are located on the southern side of the island.

History
Some time prior to 200 B.C. a cultivated tribe called the Arawaks reached the island using dug-out canoes. These new residents brought plants, animals, and basic farming and fishing skills with them. They lived there for 1,500 years until the Caribs invaded the island.

More than 200 years after Columbus laid eyes on St. Vincent, the Europeans established a kind of permanent settlement. Its mountainous and heavily forested geography allowed the Caribs to defend against European settlement here longer than on almost any other island in the Caribbean.

After the Caribs were defeated on other islands they joined slaves who had escaped repression on Barbados by following the current and trade winds westward to St. Vincent, as well as those who had survived shipwrecks near St. Vincent and Bequia.

The mixed descendants of the island warriors and the freed Africans, who became known as the Black Caribs, had a common distrust and disgust for the Europeans, and proved to be a fearsome foe. The Caribs feared complete domination so they allowed the French to construct a settlement on the island in 1719. The French brought slaves to work their plantations. By 1748, the Treaty of Aix-la-Chapelle officially declared St. Vincent and its surrounding islands to be a neutral island, controlled by neither Britain nor France. The two countries continued to contest control of the islands, however, until they were definitively ceded to the British in 1814.

In 1951 universal adult suffrage was introduced in Saint Vincent and the Grenadines and in 1979, it became an independent state within the British Commonwealth with a democratic government based on the British system.

Not long ago, though, the island was without running water or paved roads, and it tallied more turtles than human residents. Now, there's a runway for private jets, a flurry of new luxury hotels and villas, and a multimillion-dollar marina for mega yachts.

Climate
The driest season is from December to May. The coolest months are between November and February.

Resort development
In the early 1990s the Canouan Resorts Development company was formed and secured lease for areas of the island to build two hotels - the former Raffles Resort site and Tamarind Beach Hotel site. At this point the building arm of the company built roads throughout Canouan (previously only dirt tracks), installed electricity to the island and residents houses and provided desalinated water for the first time. Prior to that, fresh water was brought by boat from St. Vincent on a regular basis. Locals not employed by the resort were forbidden admittance to the property as it was private property, although the beaches remained open for public use. It was announced that the resort would revert from Raffles/Fairmont Resorts back to Carenage Bay Resort on May 20, 2010. The property then became Pink Sands Club which opened in 2016. In 2018 the newer section of the property became managed by Mandarin Oriental. The original villas and suites now make up Canouan Estate Resort & Villas. Located on the 1200-acre estate Canouan Estate Resort & Villas include a collection of luxury suites and villas. Amenities includes 4 beaches, 4 restaurants and bars, a Jim Fazio designed 18-hole golf course, non-motorized water sports, fitness center, hiking, complimentary kids club, snorkeling, diving, boating and fishing, the resort is open year-round.

Education
There are 2 schools on Canouan - the Government Primary school and the Canouan Secondary School which opened in September 2019. Both Schools are located in the same building with the Secondary School located at the top and primary school at the bottom. There is also an official Canouan Pre-school and Private Pre-school called Coral Reef located close to the primary school and Secondary School.

Transport

In 2008, the runway at Canouan Airport was lengthened to almost 6,000 feet to accommodate larger aircraft. It is now the jet port for the Grenadines.

Scheduled ferries link Canouan to St. Vincent, Union Island and Mayreau.

Notable people
 Adonal Foyle, National Basketball Association player and political activist
 Sir John Compton, Prime Minister of St. Lucia

In popular culture
 The island (albeit mirrored and rotated 180 degrees) serves as the basis for Cayo Perico, a fictional island in the 2013 video game Grand Theft Auto Online as part of The Cayo Perico Heist update, released in 2020.

Footnotes

References
 Gonsalves, Ralph E. History and the Future: A Caribbean Perspective. Quik-Print, Kingstown, St. Vincent, January 1994.
 Berkmoes, Ryan, Ver and Raub, Kevin (2011). Caribbean Islands, 6th Edition. Lonely Planet. .

Islands of Saint Vincent and the Grenadines
Windward Islands